Bingo is a nickname for:

 William Bingo Bingham (1885–?), baseball player in the Negro leagues
 Elwood Bingo DeMoss (1889–1965), baseball player and manager in the Negro leagues
 Rudolph Kampman (1914–1987), Canadian National Hockey League player
 Gene "Bingo" O Driscoll, a former Gaelic footballer from the 1980s to the 2000s
 Robert Bingo Smith (born 1946), American retired National Basketball Association player
 John Patrick "Bingo" Walsh (est 2017), younger brother of Paige Marie Walsh, American Baby published 2017

Lists of people by nickname